is a passenger railway station located in the city of Machida, Tokyo, Japan, operated by the private railway operator Odakyu Electric Railway.

Lines

Station layout

The station has two ground-level opposed side platforms serving two tracks, with the platforms connected by a footbridge.

Platforms

History
The station was opened on 1 April 1929.

Station numbering was introduced in January 2014 with Tamagawagakuen-mae being assigned station number OH26.

Passenger statistics
In fiscal 2019, the station was used by an average of 46,581 passengers daily.

Surrounding area
Tamagawa University
Showa Pharmaceutical University

See also
List of railway stations in Japan

References

External links

 Odakyu station information 

Odakyu Odawara Line
Railway stations in Tokyo
Railway stations in Japan opened in 1929
Stations of Odakyu Electric Railway
Machida, Tokyo
Railway stations at university and college campuses